Barry Lynn Pearson (born February 4, 1950) is a former professional American football player who played wide receiver for four seasons for the Pittsburgh Steelers (1972–1973) and Kansas City Chiefs (1974–1976).

In 1972, making his pro football debut, Pearson was on the field for the Immaculate Reception and was the receiver for whom the play was designed, but Terry Bradshaw was flushed from the pocket and threw toward Frenchy Fuqua instead.

References

1950 births
Living people
People from Geneseo, Illinois
American football wide receivers
Northwestern Wildcats football players
Pittsburgh Steelers players
Kansas City Chiefs players